The men's singles tournament of the 2013 BWF World Championships (World Badminton Championships) was held from August 5 to 11. Lin Dan was the defending champion.

Lin Dan defeated Lee Chong Wei 16–21, 21–13, 20–17r in the final.

Seeds

Draw

Finals

Section 1

Section 2

Section 3

Section 4

References
tournamentsoftware.com

2013 BWF World Championships